The 22995 / 22996 Ajmer–Bandra Terminus Express is a Superfast Express train belonging to Indian Railways – North Western Railway zone that runs between Ajmer Junction and Bandra Terminus in India.

It operates as train number 22996 from Ajmer Junction to Bandra Terminus and as train number 22995 in the reverse direction, serving the state of Rajasthan, Madhya Pradesh, Gujarat & Maharashtra.

Coaches

The 22996 / 22995 Ajmer–Bandra Terminus Express presently has 1 AC 2 tier, 4 AC 3 tier, 10 Sleeper class, 5 General Unreserved & 2 EOG (Seating cum Luggage Rake) coaches. It does not have a pantry car.

As is customary with most train services in India, coach composition may be amended at the discretion of Indian Railways depending on demand.

Service

The 22996 Ajmer–Bandra TerminusExpress covers the distance of 1017 kilometres in 18 hours 00 mins (56.50 km/hr) & in 17 hours 50 mins as 22995 Bandra Terminus–Ajmer Express (57.03 km/hr).

As the average speed of the train is above 55 km/hr, as per Indian Railways rules, its fare includes a Superfast surcharge.

Routeing

The 22995/22996 Ajmer–Bandra Terminus Express runs from Ajmer Junction via ,

Traction

As the route is now fully electrified, it is hauled by a Vadodara-based WAP-7 (HOG)-equipped locomotive on its entire journey.

Timings

 22996 Ajmer–Bandra TerminusExpress leaves Ajmer Junction every Tuesday, Thursday & Saturday at 20:30 hrs IST and reaches Bandra Terminus at 14:20 hrs IST the next day.
 22995 Bandra Terminus–Ajmer Express leaves Bandra Terminus every Wednesday, Friday & Sunday at 15:45 hrs IST and reaches Ajmer Junction at 09:45 hrs IST the next day.

External links

References 

Express trains in India
Rail transport in Maharashtra
Rail transport in Gujarat
Rail transport in Madhya Pradesh
Rail transport in Rajasthan
Transport in Ajmer
Transport in Mumbai